Oldham West and Royton is a constituency represented in the House of Commons of the UK Parliament. It has been represented by Jim McMahon of the Labour Co-op party since 4 December 2015, after winning a by-election following the death of Michael Meacher on 21 October 2015.

Boundaries 

1997–2010: The Metropolitan Borough of Oldham wards of Alexandra, Chadderton Central, Chadderton North, Chadderton South, Coldhurst, Royton North, Royton South, St Paul's, and Werneth.

2010–present: The Metropolitan Borough of Oldham wards of Chadderton Central, Chadderton North, Chadderton South, Coldhurst, Hollinwood, Medlock Vale, Royton North, Royton South, and Werneth.

The constituency is one of three covering the Metropolitan Borough of Oldham.  It covers most of the western part of the borough, including Chadderton and Royton but not Failsworth which is in the Ashton-under-Lyne constituency.

Name 
In July 2006 fourteen representations were received by the Boundary Commission for England, which called for the inclusion of Chadderton in the name of the Oldham West and Royton parliamentary constituency. Many of these objectors pointed out that Chadderton was much larger and more populous than Royton.  The commission rejected the proposed alternative name (Oldham West, Chadderton and Royton) because it was too long and they did not believe that there was a significant amount of support for a name change.

History 
The present constituency was formed in 1997 from parts of the former Oldham Central and Royton and Oldham West constituencies and has to date been a safe seat for the Labour Party, having been held by Michael Meacher since the 1997 general election.  Meacher had previously been the MP for the predecessor seat of Oldham West since 1970.

Despite no part of the constituency, nor Oldham Metropolitan Borough Council ever having had a BNP councillor, the constituency gained a level of notoriety at the 2001 general election when the leader of the far-right British National Party (BNP), Nick Griffin, stood as a candidate. Griffin received 6,552 votes (a 16.4% share), beating the Liberal Democrats to third place and 524 votes behind the Conservative Duncan Reed in second. This was widely interpreted to be a reaction to the serious race riots that had occurred in Oldham (and other northern towns) a few months earlier.  Because of the heightened tension, the Returning Officer took the decision not to allow any candidates to make speeches after the declaration of the results. This led to Griffin and fellow BNP candidate Michael Treacy, who ran in the neighbouring constituency of Oldham East and Saddleworth, symbolically gagging themselves on the platform wearing T-shirts bearing the slogan "Gagged for Telling the Truth".

In local elections following the 2001 race riots, the BNP also received considerable support: specifically in the two wards of Royton North and Royton South. However, from 2008 the BNP share of the vote has been markedly lower, with BNP and former BNP candidates coming in third or fourth in Royton North and other Oldham West and Royton Wards.

At the 2005 and 2010 general elections the BNP managed to retain their deposits (polling around 7% on both occasions) but have only achieved fourth place, with the Conservative Party second behind veteran politician Michael Meacher of the Labour Party, who stood at the 2015 general election. Meacher's death in October 2015 triggered a by-election, the first of the new Parliament, which was held on 3 December 2015 and was won by Jim McMahon of the Labour Party.

Members of Parliament

Elections

Elections in the 2010s

Elections in the 2000s

Elections in the 1990s

See also 
 List of parliamentary constituencies in Greater Manchester
 2015 Oldham West and Royton by-election

Notes

References

Parliamentary constituencies in Greater Manchester
Constituencies of the Parliament of the United Kingdom established in 1997
Politics of the Metropolitan Borough of Oldham